Amber Parkinson (born 3 October 1976 in Melbourne) is an Australian épée fencer.

As an Athlete
Parkinson was ranked first in the Australian Open Fencing Championships in December 2007. In August 2007 Parkinson competed in the Asian Fencing Championships Nantong, China, coming second.  Parkinson also competed at several fencing tournaments in Europe for 10 weeks in early 2008 resulting in her qualifying for the Australian Olympic Fencing Team for Beijing 2008.  In April 2008 Parkinson came third in the Asian Fencing Championships.

Achievements
 Australian Open Fencing Championships December 2007, Gold
 Asian Fencing Championships, Nantong, China, August 2007, Silver
 Asian Fencing championships, Bangkok, Thailand, April 2008, Bronze
 Germany Fencing Championships Berlin, June 2000 Gold

References

External links
 Amber Parkinson's official website
 Parkinson's bio on the Australian Olympic Games team website.
 
 
 
 

1976 births
Living people
Australian female épée fencers
Olympic fencers of Australia
Fencers at the 2008 Summer Olympics